{{DISPLAYTITLE:C5H10O4}}
The molecular formula C5H10O4 (molar mass: 134.13 g/mol, exact mass: 134.0579 u) may refer to:

 Deoxyribose, or 2-Deoxyribose
 L-Deoxyribose
 Monoacetylglycerol
 1,4-Anhydroxylitol, or Xylitan